Rachael Georgina Hamilton (born 1970) is a Scottish Conservative Party politician, who has served as the Member of the Scottish Parliament (MSP) for Ettrick, Roxburgh and Berwickshire since 2017.

Hamilton has served as the Conservative Shadow Cabinet Secretary for Rural Economy and Tourism and for Social Security and Older People. She was previously a list MSP for the South Scotland region, elected in the 2016 Scottish Parliament election. She was elected as constituency MSP for Ettrick, Roxburgh and Berwickshire at a 2017 by-election. 

She owns the Buccleuch Arms Hotel in St Boswells.

Background
Hamilton was born in Brecon, Wales and grew up on the family farm in Herefordshire. She studied agriculture at Harper Adams University College in Shropshire and after graduating joined a graduate training programme to become an agronomist with Schering Agriculture.

Politics

In 2016 Hamilton stood for the Scottish Parliament as the Conservative candidate for the East Lothian constituency where she came third, then was elected from the South Scotland regional list.

Hamilton resigned her list seat in order to contest the 2017 Ettrick, Roxburgh and Berwickshire by-election on 8 June. She won the by-election with a majority of over 9,000.

From 2016 to 2020, Hamilton served as Shadow Cabinet Secretary for Culture and Tourism on Scottish Conservative frontbench in the Scottish Parliament. She sits on the public petitions  Committee in the Scottish Parliament.

In the February 2020 Scottish Conservatives leadership election, Hamilton served as co-chair of Jackson Carlaw's leadership campaign, alongside Liam Kerr.

At the 2021 Scottish Parliament election, Hamilton was re-elected as the MSP for Ettrick, Roxburgh and Berwickshire, returning with over 51% of the vote. On 13 May 2021, at the swearing in of the new session, Hamilton took the oath in the Welsh language.

Notes

References

External links 
 

1970 births
Living people
Place of birth missing (living people)
Conservative MSPs
Members of the Scottish Parliament 2016–2021
Members of the Scottish Parliament 2021–2026
Female members of the Scottish Parliament
British hoteliers
Alumni of Harper Adams University
People from Brecon
Scottish agronomists